Mihran Bahram-i Chubin was an Iranian nobleman from the House of Mihran. He was the son of Bahram Chobin, the famous Sasanian spahbed and briefly shahanshah. Mihran, with the aid of Christian Arab tribes, fought against the Muslim Arabs at Ayn al-Tamir. He was however, defeated. What happened to Mihran afterwards is unknown; however, it is known that he had a son named Siyavakhsh, who fell to the Arabs in 651 at Ray.

Family tree

References

Sources 
 
 
 

Generals of Yazdegerd III
Year of birth unknown
Year of death unknown
House of Mihran
7th-century Iranian people